Glyphipterix aulogramma is a species of sedge moths in the genus Glyphipterix. It was described by Edward Meyrick in 1908. It is found in New Zealand.

References

Moths described in 1908
Glyphipterigidae
Moths of New Zealand
Endemic fauna of New Zealand
Taxa named by Edward Meyrick
Endemic moths of New Zealand